Ahmed Hamdi Pasha (1826–1885) was an Ottoman monarchist, administrator and conservative statesman during the First Constitutional Era.

Biography
He was the governor of İzmir from 1873 to 1874. From 1875 to 8 May 1876, and from 1880 to 1885, he was the governor of Damascus, Syria. In 1876 he was also the governor of Shkodër, Albania for a brief period.

He served shortly as Grand Vizier of the Ottoman Empire from 11 January 1878 to 4 February 1878 during the Russo-Turkish War (1877–1878).

The Sultan Abdul Hamid II dismissed him upon pressure of the Young Ottomans during the First Constitutional Era.

He is buried in Beirut, Lebanon, in Bachoura cemetery.

References

1826 births
1885 deaths
19th-century Grand Viziers of the Ottoman Empire
People from the Ottoman Empire of Abkhazian descent
Ottoman people of the Russo-Turkish War (1877–1878)
Political people from the Ottoman Empire